Pass Me By is a 1965 studio album by Peggy Lee.

Track listing
"Sneakin' Up on You" (Ted Daryl, Chip Taylor) - 2:21
"Pass Me By" (Cy Coleman, Carolyn Leigh) - 2:23
"I Wanna Be Around" (Sadie Vimmerstedt, Johnny Mercer) - 2:26
"Bewitched" (Howard Greenfield, Jack Keller) - 2:06
"My Love, Forgive Me (Amore, Scusami)" (Gino Mescoli, Vito Pallavicini) - 2:31
"You Always Hurt the One You Love" (Doris Fisher, Allan Roberts) - 1:43
"A Hard Day's Night" (John Lennon, Paul McCartney) - 2:04
"L-O-V-E" (Bert Kaempfert, Milt Gabler) - 2:04
"Dear Heart" (Jay Livingston, Ray Evans, Henry Mancini) - 2:19
"Quiet Nights of Quiet Stars" (Antônio Carlos Jobim, Gene Lees) - 2:21
"That's What It Takes" (Peggy Lee, Cy Coleman, Bill Schluger) - 2:17

Personnel
Peggy Lee – vocal
Lou Levy – piano, arranger
Bill Pitman, Bob Bain, Dennis Budimir, John Pisano - guitar
Bob Whitlock - bass
John Guerin - drums
Francisco Aguabella - Latin percussion
Dave Grusin - big band arrangement on "Pass Me By"
Shorty Rogers - big band arrangement on "That's What It Takes"

References

1965 albums
Peggy Lee albums
Albums arranged by Shorty Rogers
Capitol Records albums